Jonathan Abrahams is an American television writer and producer, best known for his work on movies such as Greek, Mad Men and Haven. He has worked as a writer and producer for a number of television series, including Wildfire, Greek, Raising the Bar, Mad Men and Haven.


Greek episodes

 "War and Peace" (1.14)
 "Engendered Species" (2.13)

Raising the Bar episodes

 "Guatemala Gulfstream" (1.02)
 "Bagels and Locks" (1.05)
 "Out on the Roof" (1.08)
 "Hair Apparent" (2.01)
 "Is There a Doctor In the House?" (2.05)
 "Trout Fishing" (2.09)
 "Maybe, Baby" (2.13)

Mad Men episodes

 "The Good News" (4.03; with Matthew Weiner)
 "Hands and Knees" (4.10; with Matthew Weiner)

Haven episodes

 "Sparks and Recreation" (2.04)
 "Who, What, Where, Wendigo?" (2.10)
 "301" (3.01)

Awards and nominations
In 2011, Abrahams won both a Writers Guild of America Award and a Primetime Emmy Award for his work on the fourth season of Mad Men.

References

External links

Living people
American male screenwriters
American television producers
American television writers
Writers Guild of America Award winners
Place of birth missing (living people)
Year of birth missing (living people)
American male television writers